Batrachoides is a genus of toadfishes.

Species
The recognized species in this genus are:
 Batrachoides boulengeri C. H. Gilbert & Starks, 1904 (Boulenger's toadfish)
 Batrachoides gilberti Meek & Hildebrand, 1928 (large-eye toadfish)
 Batrachoides goldmani Evermann & Goldsborough, 1902 (Mexican freshwater toadfish)
 Batrachoides liberiensis (Steindachner, 1867) (hairy toadfish)
 Batrachoides manglae Cervigón, 1964 (cotuero toadfish)
 Batrachoides pacifici (Günther, 1861) (Pacific toadfish)
 Batrachoides surinamensis (Bloch & J. G. Schneider, 1801) (Pacuma toadfish)
 Batrachoides walkeri Collette & Russo, 1981 (Walker's toadfish)
 Batrachoides waltersi Collette & Russo, 1981 (Walters' toadfish)

References

 
Batrachoididae
Taxonomy articles created by Polbot

az:Batrachoides